The following is a list of radio stations in Montenegro.

National coverage

Regional and local coverage

External links
 Radiomap.eu: Radio stanice u Podgorici 
 Radiostanica.com:Crnogorske radio stanice uživo preko interneta! 

 
Montenegro
Radio stations